Kjetil Dyrendahl Try (born 24 July 1959) is a Norwegian advertising agency executive and crime fiction writer.

Personal life
Try grew up at Manglerud in Oslo. He has played ice hockey for the club Manglerud Star, and participated in the 1983 film , where he played the character "Pettern".

Career
Try made his literary debut in 1997 with the crime fiction novel Stø kurs. Later novels are Pavlovs hunder (2002), La de små barn komme til meg (2008), and Frels oss fra det onde (2011).

Try is known as a close friend to Labour Party politician and former prime minister Jens Stoltenberg; they graduated together from Oslo Cathedral School in 1978. Starting from 1989, Try has been involved in designing many election campaigns for the Norwegian Labour Party. In his autobiography from 2016, Stoltenberg revealed that Try had advised him on several occasions.

Try won a Cannes Golden Lion in 1990 for a film commercial for "Polly" potato chips.

References

1959 births
Living people
Writers from Oslo
Norwegian ice hockey players
Manglerud Star Ishockey players
Businesspeople from Oslo
People educated at Oslo Cathedral School
Norwegian social democrats